Mysmena wawuensis is a species of spider found in China. It grows to 0.75 millimetres long. It is named after the Wawu Mountain National Forest Park in Sichuan Province in southwestern China where it was discovered and first described in 2013 by Yucheng Lin and Shuqiang Li.

Description
The carapace is round in the male and pear-shaped in the female. The cephalothorax is brown with dark margins, the sternum is black and the disproportionately large opisthosoma is black, with yellow flecks.

References

Spiders of China
Mysmenidae
Spiders described in 2013